Fred Kapondi is a Kenyan politician. He belongs to the united Democratic Alliance and was elected to represent the Mt. Elgon Constituency in the National Assembly of Kenya since the 2017 Kenyan parliamentary election.

References

Living people
Orange Democratic Movement politicians
Members of the National Assembly (Kenya)
Year of birth missing (living people)